Susannah Jane Lamplugh (born 3 May 1961) was a British estate agent reported missing on 28 July 1986 (aged 25) in Fulham, London, England, United Kingdom. She was officially declared dead, presumed murdered, in 1993. The last clue to Lamplugh's whereabouts was an appointment to show a house in Shorrolds Road to someone she referred to as "Mr Kipper". As of 2023, the case remains unsolved.

John Cannan, a convicted criminal responsible for the murder of Shirley Banks in 1987 and many other rapes, abductions and attempted abductions since his release from a nearby prison three days before Lamplugh's disappearance, is the only suspect in the murder of Lamplugh. In November 2002, the Crown Prosecution Service decided that there was insufficient evidence to charge Cannan, but that month police announced at a press conference, in an extremely rare move, that they believed Cannan was the man who murdered her. 

Cannan himself says he knows who killed Lamplugh, and states that this person is the same person responsible for the murder of Shirley Banks, for which he himself was convicted. He is known to have shown up uninvited at a house that was for sale in Shorrolds Road in the days before the disappearance, believing that the young female occupant was alone in the house, and started acting strangely until the woman's husband appeared, causing him to quickly leave. DNA evidence has also shown that Lamplugh had previously been in a car he owned at the time of her disappearance.

Disappearance

Lamplugh was an estate agent, who was reported missing after attending an appointment with someone calling himself "Mr Kipper", to show him round a house in Shorrolds Road, Fulham. Her office diary recorded the details of the appointment as: "12.45 Mr. Kipper – 37 Shorrolds O/S". The "O/S" annotation means "outside the property". Three witnesses saw her outside 37 Shorrolds Road between 12:45 and 1:00 p.m. A man walking home past the house saw Suzy waiting in the gateway of the property at 12:50 p.m., and she seemed to be waiting for someone. Ten minutes after that the owner of the house next door heard someone leaving number 37, and saw Suzy and a man leaving the house and looking back up at it. This sighting was later the basis of an artists impression made of the unidentified male. 

The sighting of the pair standing outside the house was corroborated by another man who was walking past the property at around the same time. He noticed that the man was holding a bottle of champagne with ribbons around it. This sighting was later the basis of an identikit picture made of the man. Witnesses reported that they then saw the pair getting into a car. The neighbour later said that he thought that the pair had been arguing and that the man had bundled Lamplugh into a car. The witnesses described the man as a white male between 25 and 30, with a dark complexion and with dark hair swept back. He was immaculately dressed in a dark charcoal suit, and was described as a "public schoolboy type". He may have had a broken nose. A man said that he had seen a "couple arguing" between 2:00 and 2:30 p.m. in the area. There was then a sighting of Lamplugh driving her car erratically away from Shorrolds Road, arguing with the man in the car, causing the witness to have to swerve his own vehicle out of the way to avoid a collision.

However, a close friend of Lamplugh's, Barbara Whitfield, saw Lamplugh driving north up the Fulham Palace Road in her car with a man at around 2:45 p.m., and she insisted that she had no doubt that it was Lamplugh. She waved to Lamplugh as she cycled south down the road but Suzy was talking to her passenger and didn't see her. Whitfield was the only witness that day who actually knew Lamplugh, and so her sighting was given significant weight. A woman living at 139 Stevenage Road also reported possibly seeing Lamplugh with a smartly-dressed man wearing a suit by the spot where her car was seen parked. 

By 3:30 p.m., Lamplugh's colleagues at the estate agents were becoming concerned that she had not returned. At 4:30 they went over to 37 Shorrolds Road to see if she was there, but she was not. At 5:30 they called the police to report her missing. 

At 10:00 p.m. a police officer found her car parked in the same spot it had been sighted at that afternoon, which was by another house for sale. The vehicle appeared to have been parked in haste: the driver's door was open, the handbrake was off and the car key was missing. It was also parked poorly and was partly overlapping a garage. Lamplugh's purse was found in the car. Neither her own keys or the keys to 37 Shorrolds Road were found. The driver's seat was pushed back from the position Suzy would usually have had it in, and with Lamplugh only being 5ft 6in tall, she could not have driven the car with the seat pushed as far back as it was. This indicated that someone else had driven the car.

Police suggested that a black, left-hand drive BMW vehicle may have been involved, because of an eyewitness account of a car of that description seen parked in Shorrolds Road. The man remembered seeing it because many cars in the road had been double parked, causing him to have some difficulties driving through the road. Another witness corroborated this account and said that he had seen the dark BMW parked almost outside 37 Shorrolds Road. Witnesses also came forward to say that they had seen not one but two white Ford Fiestas parked in Shorrolds Road that day. 

A witness came forward some time later with another significant sighting. He had initially come forward after the disappearance, but had his account dismissed then because he described a blonde woman, and the officers who interviewed him incorrectly assumed that Lamplugh was brown-haired when she vanished. A man out jogging had seen a car speeding south down Stevenage Road (the same road Lamplugh's car was later found abandoned on) as he jogged out of Bishop's Park into the road at the exit by Fulham F.C.'s Craven Cottage stadium. The car, notably a dark left-hand drive BMW, suddenly came to a stop further down the road and a woman who matched Lamplugh's disappearance was seen struggling with a man inside it and beeping the horn in an apparent attempt to attract attention. In his description of the incident, the man stated:

Initial investigations

Missing person inquiry

Suzy's then boyfriend, a 27-year-old stockbroker, and her male flatmate were both questioned by police, but were found to have confirmed alibis for the day in question. They had both spent time with business associates or friends and many witnesses corroborated their accounts, meaning the pair were quickly eliminated from inquiries. Lamplugh's two-bedroom flat in Putney was searched, but nothing notable or suspicious was found. It was soon pointed out in the press that, were Mr Kipper to be given the first name Dan, that the words combined would be an anagram of 'Kidnapper'. Suzy's officer manager revealed that a bunch of red roses had been delivered to her office by a mystery man just days before she disappeared.

An initial mistake made in the investigation into Lamplugh's disappearance was the issuing of an image of her with dark brown hair to the press; Lamplugh had actually tinted her hair blonde the Friday before she vanished. The initial investigation was conducted without computers, with an old-fashioned card index system being used, whereby all leads were filed on some 26,000 cards. Because Lamplugh was only considered a missing person, known criminals in the area were not considered as suspects. 

Six months after Lamplugh's disappearance, a man came forward to inform police that he had discovered that a BMW car that had been left abandoned in a road for some months was registered to a Belgian man known sometimes as "Mr Kiper". Because the car was a BMW, as had been seen in Shorrolds Road, detectives believed this was significant. However, the man was tracked down to Belgium and found to have a confirmed alibi for the day in question, and his BMW car was discovered to have been in a garage in Belgium on the day Lamplugh disappeared. He was swiftly eliminated from inquiries.

One year after her disappearance, detectives noted that the artist's impression of "Mr Kipper" strongly resembled John Cannan, a convicted rapist (and later abductor and murderer) who had been residing in a nearby prison hostel outside HM Prison Wormwood Scrubs in the lead-up to Lamplugh's disappearance. In 1980 he had raped and beaten his girlfriend when she tried to leave him, before raping a shopkeeper at knifepoint in 1981. He had been on day release from the prison in the months preceding Lamplugh's disappearance, and had been given a job in the area as a porter. Cannan was public school-educatedand was known by others for his uncanny ability to attract women; he had told inmates and workmates, in the weeks before Lamplugh disappeared, that he was enjoying going to wine bars in Fulham and had met a new "uptown girl" girlfriend named 'Susu'. Some of these local wine bars were also visited by Suzy, with one named the Crocodile Tears located opposite the office in which she worked. Another place Cannan frequented was the Prince of Wales pub in Putney, which Lamplugh was known to have visited on the very day Cannan was released by the nearby prison, three days before Lamplugh was last seen. Cannan confirmed in 2021 that he visited such local drinking establishments. He also often delivered roses to women as a romantic ploy, as had happened in the Lamplugh case. He also had said to others that he was interested in buying a property in the area. Cannan was released from Wormwood Scrubs on 25 July 1986; three days later, Lamplugh vanished nearby.

In June 1987, Lamplugh's mother Diane said that she believed Suzy was dead.

Shirley Banks and Cannan links investigated

Fifteen months after Lamplugh's disappearance, in October 1987, John Cannan abducted and murdered 29-year-old Shirley Banks from Bristol, before attempting to rape two women in a shop three weeks later after driving to the shop in his black BMW. He had also tried to abduct a woman the night before he abducted Banks, and had been using wine bars in Bristol as "hunting grounds" to search for victims. He had held Banks hostage in his flat for 18 hours before killing her and dumping her at a site in the Quantock Hills known as "Dead Woman's Ditch". Inside his dark BMW was found an imitation handgun, handcuffs and the tax disc for Banks's car. Soon after Cannan was arrested, Banks' Mini car was found hidden in his garage, with a new, false number plate affixed reading "SLP 386S". Detectives would later note that the letters SLP could stand for Suzy Lamplugh, and the number 86 for 1986, the year she vanished. The media at this time began to note the likeness between Cannan and the photofit in the Lamplugh case, and speculated on a link between the Banks and Lamplugh cases. It was also highly-publicised that Cannan had joined a dating agency in Bristol only weeks before he murdered Banks, giving the false name of John Peterson, and had presented himself in a recorded video as a successful, smartly-dressed businessman. The video remains publicly available.

At this point, Metropolitan Police detectives went to Bristol to interview Cannan about the Lamplugh disappearance. When he was asked by detectives if he understood the significance of the number plate, he unexpectedly replied immediately that it could be seen as a reference to Suzy Lamplugh, who had not yet been mentioned at that point. However, he claimed that he chose the letters on the plate at random. He claimed that he had bought the car off a "Bristol businessman" who was responsible for "the murders of Shirley Banks, Suzy Lamplugh and another girl", and that this man was in a lot of trouble. Cannan himself was known for masquerading as a Bristol businessman. When asked if this man was him, Cannan replied "yes" but then immediately recanted and ended the interview because he was overcome with emotion.

Cannan was sentenced to life imprisonment for the murder of Banks and for several other rapes, abductions and attempted abductions. He was also convicted of the rape of a woman in Reading, on the train line between London and Bristol, 6 weeks after his release from Wormwood Scrubs. The judge who sentenced him told him "you should never again be at liberty outside of prison walls". Further interviews were carried out with Cannan over Lamplugh's disappearance in 1988, 1989 and 1990. However, he was not put on an identity parade.

In 1990, a woman named Gilly Paige, who Cannan had been in a relationship with after Lamplugh's disappearance, informed police that Cannan had spoken to her about the Lamplugh case and had told her that she was buried at Norton Barracks while they were driving past on the M5 motorway. Another of Cannan's former girlfriends, Daphne Sargent, also formed the view that Cannan was responsible, saying: "As soon as I heard about Suzy, I knew it was John. It had all the hallmarks - right down to the champagne."

Case goes cold
In the years after Lamplugh's disappearance, police tested the DNA of 800 unidentified bodies and skeletal remains that matched her description. Lamplugh was officially declared dead, at her parents' behest, exactly seven years after her 1986 disappearance, on 27 July 1993; she was presumed to have been murdered.

Andrew Stephen book controversy 
In 1988, journalist Andrew Stephen published a highly controversial book on the Lamplugh case. The book, which was initially supported by the Lamplugh family before they read the draft versions of it, made a number of allegations about her sex life and personal life. This included a suggestion at one stage that she could have been involved in prostitution. The book was widely labelled as salacious and false, and Stephen was accused of victim blaming. In an unprecedented move, the Metropolitan Police responded to the book by defending Lamplugh's personal life and stating "our investigations revealed nothing more than that Suzy was a modern young woman". 

A review of the book in The Times was highly critical and asserted that Stephen had included a large amount of his own speculations on what he called Lamplugh's "quest for sexual fulfilment" because he needed filler material to add to the story. The Lamplugh family took legal action and forced Stephen to add a disclaimer to the book stating that they did not recognise or accept the portrayal of Lamplugh.

Michael Sams speculation and elimination
In the mid 1990s, there was speculation that Michael Sams could have murdered Lamplugh, since he had just been convicted of kidnapping an estate agent named Stephanie Slater in Birmingham. However, police found no evidence for this theory and discounted it, noting that Sams' own crimes were more likely influenced by the high-profile Lamplugh case. Furthermore, Sams only had one leg, and no witness sightings of the man Lamplugh was seen with that day report him having a limp or only one leg, demonstrating that he is not a viable suspect.

Case re-opened

Reinvestigations

In 1999, an internal report by the Metropolitan Police criticised the handling of the original investigation and failure to further investigate John Cannan. A new reinvestigation was subsequently launched in the early 2000s under a new team, with detectives being told that they should seek to find out whether Cannan could be eliminated as a suspect or implicated in her murder. The re-investigations established that Cannan could not be eliminated and in fact found more evidence which implicated him.  

The original index cards in the case were computerised, and it was discovered that a number of estate agents in Fulham had been visited at the time by a man calling himself Mr Kipper. Detectives believed that this was Cannan looking out for potential victims for abduction and murder. In the late 70s and into 1980, during the final years of Cannan's troubled marriage to his wife June Vale, there had been a series of mysterious rapes in homes for sale in the west Midlands, where Cannan was living at that time. The unidentified rapist specifically targeted homes on the market at estate agents, and became known as the "House for sale rapist". 20 women were assaulted and raped in properties in the area, and no one was ever arrested for the crimes. Police suspect that Cannan was responsible for these offences and that he began committing them after his marriage began to fail. The rapes stopped in early 1980 when Cannan began a new relationship with a woman named Sharon Major. Detectives would later note that the offences bore all the hallmarks of Cannan's later crimes and also noted the similarities to the Lamplugh case. Notably, Cannan had shown up uninvited to a house that was for sale in Shorrolds Road days before Lamplugh was last seen, believing that the young female occupant was alone in the house. He started acting strangely until the woman's husband appeared, causing him to quickly leave.

After new reconstructions were shown on Crimewatch in 2000, this time with the correct pictures of Lamplugh with blonde hair used, new witnesses came forward. This included a man who said that he had seen a man resembling Cannan looking into the window of Lamplugh's estate agents the day she went missing, putting him in Fulham the day she disappeared. Lamplugh had worked at a desk right by the window, in part because the office believed that having an attractive woman such as her by the window would attract customers. Some individuals also came forward after police showed Cannan's 1987 dating video, with the witnesses positively identifying him as a man they had seen in Fulham that day.

During the reinvestigation of the Lamplugh case, a mass of circumstantial evidence was uncovered that pointed to Cannan. It was discovered that Lamplugh had disclosed to relatives shortly before she disappeared that she had a new boyfriend from the Bristol area, to which Cannan moved days after Lamplugh's disappearance and where his family were from, and Lamplugh had told a relative shortly before she vanished that she was concerned about this man and that she was getting scared of him. Despite being in prison in the borough of Hammersmith and Fulham before the disappearance, Cannan denied ever having been to Fulham, the town from which Lamplugh had vanished. Police disproved this, as he was known to have had worked as a porter in the area at the time, while on day release from the open prison. The witness sightings of a dark, left-hand drive BMW being parked near to Lamplugh, and in which Lamplugh was believed to have been seen struggling were given added significance when it emerged that Cannan owned a dark-coloured left-hand drive BMW at the time, which he used to commit crimes with a fellow inmate. Cannan did not have an alibi for the days after leaving prison, and, conveniently, does not recall where he was, despite having an impeccable memory of other events at the time. He says he does not know where he was for the first three days after leaving prison and has never provided an alibi to police for Lamplugh's disappearance. Cannan's nickname in prison was also "Mr Kipper" due to his preference for wearing kipper-style broad ties.

In December 2000, Cannan was arrested on suspicion of Lamplugh's abduction and murder and interviewed at Hammersmith police station. Video footage of parts of the interview were later leaked publicly and are still available for the public to view. In the footage, Cannan says that there are "one or two things I haven't been caught for". Over 5 days of interviews, Cannan did not provide interviewers with any information which could eliminate him from the inquiry, and did not provide an alibi for his movements between 25 and 28 July 1986. In September 2001 Cannan was arrested again and questioned at a London police station, but he again provided no information which could eliminate him from the inquiry.

Mysterious call on the afternoon of disappearance
One piece of evidence investigators saw as significant regarded a mysterious phone call that was made on the afternoon Lamplugh disappeared, which detectives believed was made by Lamplugh herself. Three days before she disappeared, the same day Cannan was released from the open prison nearby, Lamplugh had gone to the Prince of Wales pub in Putney, which was also frequented by Cannan. While she was there, the contents of her handbag went missing, and after she left they were found by the landlord of the pub. The landlord telephoned Lamplugh to inform her and she arranged to collect her belongings at 6pm on Monday 28 July – the day she disappeared. On this afternoon, a few hours after she vanished, a woman who gave her name as 'Sarah' called the pub saying she had a message for Suzy, giving her number. Then, a man called the pub claiming to be a 'policeman', asking if they had Suzy's diary and chequebook. The police confirmed the man was not a policeman, and it was not known who 'Sarah' was. The landlord said he gave the paper he had written the number on to police, although it was then lost. 

The call was made well before Lamplugh's disappearance had even been reported, and it may have been Lamplugh making a plea for help, or calling under duress. The 'policeman' may have been Cannan. When Shirley Banks had been abducted by Cannan and held hostage in his flat in 1987, she made a call under duress to her workplace the next morning, saying that she wasn't coming in as she was unwell. It is believed that she did this because Cannan had duped her into thinking he would release her unharmed. This was the last that was heard from her before she was found murdered.

Detectives on the reinvestigation team also believed that Cannan could have been responsible for taking the contents of her handbag in the first place, and stated the events were a clear indicator of stalking.

Searches for body

On the evidence they found, the police made the decision to search for Lamplugh's body. Investigators wanted to dig at Norton Barracks, the location Cannan allegedly told former girlfriend Gilly Paige was the burial site of Lamplugh, and which an anonymous informant had identified to police in 1999 as being the place where Lamplugh was buried. However, the area had been massively re-developed in the intervening years, the army having left the site in 1979, and they were not able to dig at the area because it would have involved digging up houses and their foundations. 

Detectives considered the possibility that the number plate Cannan had attached to Banks' car which read SLP 386S could be an ordnance survey grid reference, since this would notably give a location very close to Dead Women's Ditch, where Banks was found dumped. Cannan was known as someone who would play such tricks with investigators, and it was believed that his decision to dump Banks' body in 'Dead Women's Ditch' was entirely intentional, and so too could be the wording of the number plate. As a result, investigators decided to search the area. However, Lamplugh's body was not found.

In December 2000, police searched a brickworks nearby to Norton Barracks, which had been mentioned in several of the original witness statements. A year later, another search was conducted in Somerset at a location by a river which Cannan was said to have frequented. However, she was not found.

Cannan announced as murderer

The Lamplugh case team decided that there was significant enough evidence against Cannan to apply for a prosecution. The Crown Prosecution Service agreed that the police reinvestigation had been excellent and thorough, but ultimately decided, after four months of deliberations, that there was insufficient evidence to charge Cannan with the murder of Lamplugh. The police so strongly felt Cannan was responsible, however, that they announced it in a press conference in November 2002. They also announced that all other possible suspects had been eliminated and that Cannan was the only suspect. The lead detective in the re-investigations, Jim Dickie, stated that he was as certain as he can be without going through a formal judicial process that Cannan was responsible.

The investigation was summarised in an ITV Real Crime programme in 2002.

In 2007, a criminologist who had corresponded with Cannan revealed that the police reinvestigations of 2000–2002 had discovered DNA evidence in a car previously owned by Cannan that showed Lamplugh had previously been inside the vehicle. The criminologist had pointed out to police that Cannan himself said he had access to a red Ford Sierra at the time Lamplugh disappeared, which police were previously unaware of. Detectives subsequently attempted to find the car and discovered it in a north London scrap yard, allowing them to conduct DNA analysis on it. Although these tests indicated Lamplugh had been in the car, as well as Cannan, the Crown Prosecution Service felt there was insufficient evidence to prove that they had been in the vehicle at the same time, meaning charges could not be brought against Cannan for her murder. Although he previously had said he drove this car often, Cannan has since changed his story and now denies ever using the vehicle. This is despite the fact that the man who lent it to him has confirmed that Cannan had access to it at the time and said Cannan may have had used it on the day Lamplugh disappeared.

Links to Sandra Court murder
When interviewed about the disappearance of Lamplugh in 1988, Cannan had said he knew a "Bristol businessman" that was responsible for "the murders of Shirley Banks, Suzy Lamplugh and another girl" (investigators believe him to be talking about himself, since he was convicted of Banks' murder). The "other girl" he referred to is believed to be Sandra Court, a 27-year-old officer worker who was abducted and killed in Bournemouth in May 1986. In November 2001, Police interviewed Cannan at a police station in York over her murder. He had been in the prison hostel at Wormwood Scrubs at the time, but was allowed out at weekends and had access to a red Ford Sierra (the same which was tested in the Lamplugh case). A pay-and-display ticket proves that Cannan was in Bournemouth the day she was killed. Court had been dropped off by a taxi driver in Throop, Dorset, near her sister's house after a night out, but her sister was not at home. She was last seen walking barefoot, appearing slightly drunk, at around 2:45 am. Court's body was found the next day in a water-filled ditch several miles away. When interviewed, Cannan denied having ever been to Bournemouth on the day in question, but was proved to be lying through the parking tickets discovered by police. 

When the Ford Sierra was discovered at the north London scrap yard during the Lamplugh reinvestigations of the early 2000s, two hairs were found inside that matched the DNA of Sandra Court. Cannan would have had access to this car when Court was murdered. Despite this, the DNA evidence was not strong enough to bring a prosecution against Cannan for her murder.

Steve Wright speculation and elimination
In 1982, Lamplugh had worked as a beautician on the ocean liner Queen Elizabeth 2. At the same time, Steve Wright, who was convicted in February 2008 of the murder of five women in Ipswich, was working as a steward on the QE2. In 2008, the Metropolitan Police investigated whether Wright was connected with Lamplugh's disappearance, but this was not a strong line of enquiry and a senior Met police officer described the link as "speculative". Police looked into Steve Wright's QE2 work records and found that he was working on the ship the day Lamplugh disappeared, meaning he could not have been responsible for her abduction and murder.

Later searches
In August 2010, police began searching a field off the B4084 between Pershore and Drakes Broughton, about three miles from the former Norton Barracks in Worcestershire where detectives had wanted to search in 2000. Investigators also returned to Norton Barracks itself and subjected it to a limited search, but her remains were not found.

In December 2002, one of Cannan's fellow prisoners had told police that Cannan had said he had buried Lamplugh under the patio of his mother's house in Sutton Coldfield, in the West Midlands. In late October 2018, police began searching the house. They dismantled the garage and began removing its concrete floor, whilst also carrying out a search of the back garden. On 12 November 2018, police announced that the search of the property had ended and no evidence had been found.

In July 2019, a police search of land in Pershore, with the assistance of archaeologists, produced no relevant evidence. In August 2019, the Specialist Investigation Team received a sighting from the time of the disappearance of a man resembling Cannan dumping a suitcase in the Grand Union Canal. However, this section of the canal was previously searched in September 2014 for an unrelated inquiry. This canal sighting was covered in the documentaries The Vanishing of Suzy Lamplugh and In the Footsteps of Killers.

Current status
Cannan remains the prime (and only) suspect in the case. He has previously claimed that the Metropolitan Police have ruled him out as a suspect in the Lamplugh case, which is false. He protests his innocence not only of involvement in Lamplugh's disappearance but of nearly all other crimes he has been convicted of, including those which were proven with DNA links and fingerprint evidence, such as the case of the rape of the woman in Reading, in which forensic evidence showed the chances of the perpetrator being anyone other than Cannan were 260 million to one.

While in prison, Cannan told a solicitor that he might well "reveal all" about Lamplugh when his mother died. However, in 2020, his brother revealed that his sister had already unsuccessfully begged him to reveal the location of Lamplugh's body, and the brother insists he will "take his secrets to the grave" because he "doesn't have a modicum of regret, conscience or compassion" and is "a power freak". Criminologist Christopher Berry-Dee, who exchanged hundreds of letters with Cannan when writing a book on him, has also said that Cannan will not reveal where he put the body as he is a "control freak". Fellow criminologist David Wilson has agreed and said that Cannan will not confess because he is a psychopath. 

Cannan was eligible for parole in 2022.

Suzy Lamplugh Trust
The Suzy Lamplugh Trust is a charitable foundation established in December 1986 by Lamplugh's parents, Paul and Diana Lamplugh. The mission of the Trust is to raise awareness of personal safety through training and various projects, to help people avoid becoming victims of aggression, and to offer counselling and support to relatives and friends of missing people. The Trust runs the UK's The National Stalking Helpline.

Paul and Diana Lamplugh were appointed to OBE, in 1992 and 2005 respectively, for their charitable work with the Suzy Lamplugh Trust. Diana Lamplugh died in August 2011 at the age of 75, and Paul Lamplugh died aged 87 in June 2018. Rachel Griffin, CEO of the Trust since 2012, died of cancer in August 2019.

Commemorative window
Lamplugh and her family were members of the congregation at All Saints Church, East Sheen, in the London Borough of Richmond upon Thames. Suzy is commemorated there in a stained glass window which was installed in 1996.

Television documentaries
Lamplugh's disappearance has been the subject of a number of documentaries:
On 16 August 1989, a Crimewatch File documentary on John Cannan's conviction for the murder of Shirley Banks was shown. It also noted the suggestions of a possible link between Cannan and the Lamplugh murder. Cannan tried unsuccessfully to prevent the programme being aired.
On 12 September 2001, a Real Crime documentary was aired on ITV that examined the Lamplugh case. It was concluded that Cannan was likely responsible for her murder.
In 2002, a documentary titled The Man Who Killed Suzy Lamplugh? was aired on Channel 5. It concluded that Cannan was likely responsible for her murder.
In 2015, a Crimes That Shook Britain documentary aired that focused on the Lamplugh case. It concluded that Cannan was likely responsible for her murder.
In December 2020, a documentary titled The Vanishing of Suzy Lamplugh aired on Channel 5. It concluded that Cannan was likely responsible for her murder.
On 9 March 2021, a two-part Sky TV documentary titled The Suzy Lamplugh Mystery/The Mystery of Suzy Lamplugh, was shown. It concluded that Cannan was likely responsible for her murder. 
On 16 June 2021, an episode of Channel 4 and criminologist David Wilson's documentary series In the Footsteps of Killers aired, focusing on Lamplugh's case. It concluded that Cannan was likely responsible for her murder.

See also
List of people who disappeared
Murder of Lindsay Buziak – the 2008 murder of a real estate agent in Canada, after she met clients about whom she had expressed concerns
Murder of Helen McCourt – high-profile UK case in which the murderer refused to disclose the location of the victim's body before he died in 2022, led to the introduction of Helen's Law
Murder of Lindsay Rimer – unsolved 1994 case of a British girl who disappeared from Yorkshire and was found a year later in a nearby canal
Murder of Carolanne Jackson – another unsolved UK murder, which occurred in 1997, which is believed to have involved stalking

References

Notes

Further reading

External links
October 1986 Crimewatch reconstruction and appeal
Cannan's 1987 dating video, released by police
The Suzy Lamplugh Trust An organisation created by Suzy's mother, Diana Lamplugh, to promote personal safety.
The search for Suzy from the BBC.
BBC On this Day BBC page on 30 July 1986, the day the appeal was made by Lamplugh's parents for her safe return.
Witness describes 'Lamplugh kidnap' from the BBC.
Casefile True Crime Podcast – Case 48: Suzy Lamplugh – 4 March 2017
1989 Crimewatch File documentary on Cannan
2001 Real Crime documentary on the Lamplugh case
2002 documentary on the Lamplugh case titled The Man Who Killed Suzy Lamplugh?
2015 Crimes That Shook Britain documentary on the case
2020 documentary on the Lamplugh case titled The Vanishing of Suzy Lamplugh
2021 In the Footsteps of Killers documentary on the Lamplugh case

1980s crimes in London
1980s missing person cases
1986 in London
1986 murders in the United Kingdom
20th century in the London Borough of Hammersmith and Fulham
Deaths by person in London
Fulham
July 1986 crimes
July 1986 events in the United Kingdom
Missing person cases in London
Unsolved murders in London
Violence against women in London